Robert D. Haase (May 10, 1923September 30, 2009) was an American lawyer and Republican politician from Marinette, Wisconsin.  He was the 64th speaker of the Wisconsin State Assembly and served as Wisconsin's 26th state insurance commissioner during the administration of Governor Tommy Thompson.

Biography

Born in Marinette, Wisconsin, Haase served in the United States Army Air Forces during World War II. In 1951, Haase received his law degree from the University of Wisconsin Law School. He served on the Marinette School Board and then served in the Wisconsin State Assembly, as a Republican, from 1957 until 1965 when he resigned on September 14, 1965, to become the Wisconsin state insurance commissioner; he served as speaker of the Wisconsin Assembly in the 1963 session. He also served as adjunct professor in the University Law School and University Business School. Haase died in Mount Rainier, Maryland.

References

|-

|-

People from Marinette, Wisconsin
United States Army Air Forces personnel of World War II
Military personnel from Wisconsin
School board members in Wisconsin
Republican Party members of the Wisconsin State Assembly
University of Wisconsin Law School alumni
Wisconsin lawyers
University of Wisconsin Law School faculty
University of Wisconsin–Madison faculty
1923 births
2009 deaths
20th-century American politicians
20th-century American lawyers